Leiinae is a subfamily of fungus gnats in the family Mycetophilidae. There are at least 4 genera and about 7 described species in Leiinae.

Genera
 Docosia 
 Greenomyia 
 Leia 
 Rondaniella

References

Further reading

 Arnett, Ross H. (2000). American Insects: A Handbook of the Insects of America North of Mexico. CRC Press.

External links

 Diptera.info
 NCBI Taxonomy Browser, Leiinae

Mycetophilidae
Nematocera subfamilies